Demir Imeri (born 27 October 1995) is a Macedonian Albanian footballer who plays for KF Egnatia.

Club career
On 30 January 2019, Imeri moved to Malta and signed until June 2020 with Mosta FC in the Maltese Premier League.

References

1995 births
Living people
People from Kičevo
Albanian footballers from North Macedonia
Association football wingers
Macedonian footballers
North Macedonia youth international footballers
North Macedonia under-21 international footballers
FK Rabotnički players
KF Shkëndija players
FK Horizont Turnovo players
FK Renova players
FC Kamza players
Kemi City F.C. players
Mosta F.C. players
FC Olimpik Donetsk players
KF Vllaznia Shkodër players
KS Egnatia Rrogozhinë players
Macedonian First Football League players
Kategoria Superiore players
Veikkausliiga players
Maltese Premier League players
Ukrainian Premier League players
Macedonian expatriate footballers
Expatriate footballers in Albania
Expatriate footballers in Finland
Expatriate footballers in Malta
Expatriate footballers in Ukraine
Macedonian expatriate sportspeople in Albania
Macedonian expatriate sportspeople in Finland
Macedonian expatriate sportspeople in Malta
Macedonian expatriate sportspeople in Ukraine